Tikhonkaya (Bastı-Kem) is a rural locality (a selo) in Ust-Koksinsky District, the Altai Republic, Russia. The population was 439 as of 2016. There are 9 streets.

Geography 
Tikhonkaya is located 19 km southeast of Ust-Koksa (the district's administrative centre) by road. Verkh-Uymon and Gorbunovo are the nearest rural localities.

References 

Rural localities in Ust-Koksinsky District